The 2022 Ohio Secretary of State election was held on November 8, 2022, to elect the Secretary of State of Ohio.  Incumbent Republican Frank LaRose won re-election to a second term.

Republican primary

Candidates

Nominee
Frank LaRose, incumbent Secretary of State

Eliminated in primary
John Adams, former state representative from the 85th district (2007–2014)

Disqualified
Terpsichore “Tore” Maras-Lindeman, podcaster (running as an Independent)

Endorsements

Results

Democratic primary

Candidates

Nominee
Chelsea Clark, Forest Park city council member

Results

Independents

Qualified
Terpsehore Tore Maras, podcaster and conspiracy theorist (previously ran as a Republican)

General election

Predictions

Results

References

External links
Official campaign websites
Chelsea Clark (D) for Secretary of State
Frank LaRose (R) for Secretary of State
Terpsehore Maras (I) for Secretary of State

Secretary of State
Ohio
Ohio Secretary of State elections